Paolo Andrea Colombo (12 April 1960, Milan) is an Italian business executive. In May 2011, he was appointed president of Enel alongside CEO Fulvio Conti. He is deputy chairman of Intesa Sanpaolo.

Biography
Since 1989 Colombo was a Professor of Accounting and Budget at the University of Bocconi in Milan, the same institute that awarded him with his degree with honors in Business Administration in 1984.

As an accountant and auditor, throughout his career, Paolo Andrea Colombo was held roles as the Director of operating companies in different areas of the market including Saipem, Pirelli Pneumatici, Publitalia 80, RCS Mediagroup, Telecom Italia Mobile, Eni, and Sias.

He is a founding member of Borghesi Colombo & Associati, a financial management consultancy firm with clients in Italy and abroad, active since 2006. He is also currently president of the GE Capital Interbanca supervisory board, of Aviva Vita and a member of the Board of Directors for Mediaset and Versace.

References

1960 births
Living people
Businesspeople from Milan